On Tiptoe: Gentle Steps to Freedom, also called On Tiptoe: The Music of Ladysmith Black Mambazo is a 2000 American short documentary film directed by Eric Simonson. It tells the story of South African singers Ladysmith Black Mambazo. It was nominated for an Academy Award for Best Documentary Short.

Awards and nominations

See also
 List of documentary films
 List of American films of 2000

References

External links

On Tiptoe: Gentle Steps to Freedom at California Newsreel

2000 films
2000 short documentary films
American independent films
American short documentary films
Films directed by Eric Simonson
Documentary films about singers
South African music
Documentary films about African music
2000 independent films
2000s English-language films
2000s American films